"Oprah's Favorite Things" was an annual segment that appeared on The Oprah Winfrey Show from the 1990s to 2008 and 2010, as well as on Rachael Ray in 2017. In the segment, which airs during Thanksgiving week and was inspired by the holiday song "My Favorite Things" from The Sound of Music, Oprah Winfrey shared products with her audience that she felt were noteworthy or that would make a great gift. In addition, the audience members that were present during the taping of the episode receive items from that year's list for free.

The term is also sometimes used to describe a similar feature in O, The Oprah Magazine; while that may formally have been named "The O List" in the past, it has more recently shared the "Oprah's Favorite Things" name. The two features are often coordinated.

Episodes

The Oprah’s Favorite Things television episode is the most watched episode each year of The Oprah Winfrey Show. The episode has traditionally been aired around Thanksgiving, though its producers do not announce when the special episode will be taped. Furthermore, the audience members of these episodes are commonly selected based on a specific characteristic, which means tickets can be difficult to obtain.

2002

The items presented in the 2002 episode were included in one of four categories: food favorites; beauty and body care; books, music and home; and high-tech discoveries. The items included on the list were:

 Key lime pie
 Heart's Desire from Jan de Luz Linens
 Croissants from Galaxy
 Fat Witch Baby Gift Tin
 Good Karmal Mini Crates
 Holiday tin from Garrett Popcorn Shops
 MarieBelle Hot Chocolate Powder
Cranberry Creations Chocolates by NantucketChocolate.com
 Piper-Heidsieck Champagne
 Pillsbury Homebaked Classics Frozen Biscuits
 BlissLabs Glamour Gloves and Glamour Gel
 Origins A Perfect World White Tea Body Cream
 Kiehl's Limited Edition Gift Box
 What to Wear
 DreamTime Foot Cozys
 Velour Sweatsuit
 Karen Neuburger Pajamas and Socks
 Silver Ox Cuff Watch
 Tube Readers and Case
 Fashion Active Labs Perfect Tee
 Books, Music and Home
 Everyday Grace by Marianne Williamson
 Johnny Mathis The Christmas Album
 The Power of Now by Eckhart Tolle
 Together Book and CD Collection
 Jay Strongwater Picture Frames
 O, The Oprah Magazine subscription
 High-Tech Discoveries
 Four-in-One Camera
 Samsung mobile phone/camera
 Talking Photo Album
 Wafer-Thin CD System

2003

The 2003 episode had 350 people in its audience. The items featured in this episode included:

 Frontgate’s Portable DVD Player
 Ralph Lauren Black Label Cashmere Slim Fit Crewneck Sweater
 Melted Chocolate Cake Batter
 Greenberg Smoked Turkeys
 Barefoot Dreams Robes, Adult throws
 Cliff and Buster Macaroons
 The Gingerbread Man by Philosophy
 Pure Simplicity Pumpkin Purifying Mask
 Davies Gates Allspice Cinnamon Powder Sugar Soak
 O, The Oprah Magazine
 MAC Cosmetic Carrying Case
 Nike Dri-FIT Workout Outfit
 FoodSaver Vac 800 by Tilia, Inc.
 Cambio Jeans
 BlackBerry Wireless E-mail Device
 Frederic Fekkai Crème Luxeuse, Apple Cider Clean
 Shampoo & Conditioner
 UGG Classic Short Boots
 Judith Ripka Two Necklace
 Philip Stein Teslar Watch
 Sony DCR-DVD200 Handycam
 The Neiman Marcus Cookbook

2004

The audience for the 2004 episode consisted of teachers. Items included on the list were:

 Quilted Jacket and Cashmere Scarf by Burberry
 Dell 30" Wide-Screen LCD TV
 Bourjois Lip Products
 Eileen Fisher Waffle-Weave Merino Stretch Zip Cardigan and Pant
 Maytag Neptune Top-Load Washer and Drying Center
 Lollia Lifestyle Collection
 Hand-Blown Crystal Champagne Glasses by Deborah Ehrlich
 Dooney & Bourke Leather Duffle Bag
 Miraval Resort and Spa – Life in Balance
 Orbitz
 Apple Bottom Jeans by Nelly 
 Museum Automatic Arte Watch by Movado
 Gourmet Florida Key Lime Bundt Cake  by We Take The Cake
 VIETRI Water Garden Tea Service
 SpecialTeas Fine Tea Gift Certificate
 Williams Sonoma Home Bedding
 The Magellan RoadMate 700
 Dell Pocket DJ
 OfficeMax Gift Certificate
 Sony VAIO S260 Notebook computer
 BeBe Winans’ A Christmas Prayer CD & Starbucks Gift Card

2005

In 2005, the audience for the taping of the Oprah’s Favorite Things episode consisted of volunteers from Hurricane Katrina.  The listed items were:

 Philip Stein Teslar Diamond Watch
 Burberry Coat
 Burberry Purse
 UGG Australia's Uptown Boot
 Tin of CaramelCrisp and CheeseCorn from Garrett Popcorn Shops
 The Apple iPod
 "The Oprah Sweater" by Ralph Lauren
 Pure Color Cords
 Lovely by Sarah Jessica Parker
 BlackBerry 7105T from T-Mobile
 Brownies from Moveable Feast Geneva
 Nike Free 5.0 iD
 Kashwere Shawl Collar Robe
 Croissants from Williams-Sonoma
 Hope in a Jar from Philosophy
 "Grace" Basket from Philosophy
 Oatmeal Cookie Dough from Fox & Obel Market
 The Oprah Winfrey Show 20th Anniversary Collection DVD
 Sony VAIO FJ Notebook

2006

In 2006, the Oprah’s Favorite Things episode took on a different slant as the audience members each received a credit card valued at one thousand dollars. Each audience member also received a camcorder and was given instructions to use the money to do something kind for someone else while using the camcorder to videotape the good deed.

2007

The Favorite Things show aired November 20, 2007. It returned to the original format in previous years. The 2007 episode was filmed in Macon, Georgia in the Macon City Auditorium on November 17, 2007. "The Oprah Winfrey Show" has been national since 1986, Macon has been their number one market. At any time, 45 percent of the households in Macon, Georgia, at four o'clock, watching Oprah Winfrey.

 Samsung HD Camcorder (SC-HMX10C)
 UGG Australia Classic Crochet Boots
 ToyWatch Crystal Watches
 Perfect Endings Cupcakes by Williams-Sonoma
 Melamine Bowls by Williams-Sonoma
 KitchenAid Artisan Mixer
 Planet Earth DVD Set by The Discovery Channel
 Kai Body Butter & Buffer
 Clarisonic Skin Cleansing System
 Claus Porto Soaps from Lafco New York
 "The Pillars of the Earth" by Ken Follett
 Breville Ikon Panini Press by Williams-Sonoma
 Ciao Bella Sorbetto
 Rachel Pally Swing Turtleneck and Sailor Pants
 Scrabble Premier Edition from Hasbro
 United Artists 90th Anniversary Prestige DVD Collection
 Shaklee Get Clean
 O's Guide to Life
 Josh Groban's Noël CD
 LG HDTV Refrigerator

2008

Winfrey, in addition to the regular show, held an "Oprah's Favorite Things for Summer" episode in May 2008, apparently against her wishes and at the behest of the production staff.

The usual show aired November 26, 2008, one day before Thanksgiving; however, it did not follow the usual format of lavish gifts. Instead, owing to the nation's economic difficulties (Winfrey said that she could not in good conscience give away lavish gifts in such a time of economic trouble), this year's episode would be entitled "How to Have the Thriftiest Holiday Ever!" (described as Oprah's Favorite Things... with a twist!) All the giveaways cost "next to nothing" and emphasized do-it-yourself craftsmanship. Because of the personal nature of many of these gifts, this was the first year that audience members did not receive many of the actual gifts, though they did receive the book and the album.

Gift ideas, many of which were submitted by viewers, included:

 Gratitude boxes, filled with notes of gratitude from various people
 "Oprah's Holiday Hits" compilation album (given away for free on the show Web site)
 Treasure boxes filled with mementos
 Hot chocolate cones
 Regifts (a.k.a. "swap parties"), exchanging unwanted used items of your own for others' used items you would be more likely to use
 Gift baskets that include fruits and vegetables from your own garden
 Time with a loved one
 The Story of Edgar Sawtelle, a book by David Wroblewski

For additional gift ideas, viewers were directed to "The O List" in the December 2008 edition of O, The Oprah Magazine. The list consisted of items that cost under $100.

2009

The Huffington Post broke a story in November 2009 that, for the first time in several years, there would be no Oprah's Favorite Things episode. This turned out to be true; no reason was explicitly given for the cancellation, though the recession that had been taking place the year prior and that had served as the impetus for the low-budget Favorite Things that year was still ongoing at the time. However, Oprah held a sweepstakes in December 2009 that gave away prizes from past Favorite Things collections. The sweepstakes winner was announced and posted on the Oprah website.

2010
Oprah Winfrey's biggest Favorite Things show to date, entitled Ultimate Favorite Things, aired on Friday, November 19, 2010. A second edition aired the following Monday, November 22. It was the final Favorite Things in its original format. The 2010 Favorite Things was the only time Winfrey held a Favorite Things promotion over two episodes in any season of the show. Several of the Favorite Things were products that had been given away in previous Favorite Things episodes.

The list of products given away in the "Ultimate Favorite Things" included:

A Course in Weight Loss: 21 Spiritual Lessons for Surrendering Your Weight Forever, a book by Marianne Williamson, published by Hay House
Baker's Edge lasagna and brownie trays with Ghiradelli brownie mix
Beecher's "World's Best" macaroni and cheese
Breville panini press from Williams-Sonoma
Decoded, a book by Jay-Z
Elfa Customizable Closet System from The Container Store
Hair care products from Andre Walker, Oprah's hairstylist
Judith Ripka Eclipse Earrings
$100 gift card for Kiva
Kyocera Advanced Ceramic knife 2 piece knife giftset
Lafco House and Home Collection Candle Set
Limited edition "25th Anniversary" Oprah watch by Philip Stein
Ralph Lauren Cashmere Sweater & Cashmere Blanket
Lululemon relaxed fit pants
A five-year membership to Netflix
Four pairs of Nike running shoes
Nikon D3100 digital camera
7-day cruise on the Allure of the Seas from Royal Caribbean International
Round-trip flight on United Airlines to and from the cruise
A "25th Anniversary" Oprah shirt
Sony Bravia 52-inch 3D television and blu-ray player
The Beginning, an album from The Black Eyed Peas
Tory Burch "Silver Anniversary" tote bag and flat shoes

The second day's Favorite Things list included:

iPad, with Scrabble app
UGG Australia sparkle boots
A Coach satchel
Magaschoni tunic and leggings
Hope in a Jar moisturizer by Philosophy
Nordstrom lingerie and $500 Nordstrom gift card
Prepara Herb Saver Prepara
Chicken pot pie from Centerville Pie Company
"Oprah's Favorite Things" tin from Garrett Popcorn Shops 
Le Creuset cookware
Miraclesuit blue jeans
A jewelry box from Pottery Barn
Jessica Leigh Diamond earrings from Dana Rebecca Designs
A gift card for DonorsChoose.org
Mini croissants from Williams-Sonoma
Talbott Teas holiday assortment
The Book of Awakening, a book by Mark Nepo
Illuminations, an album from Josh Groban
Let It Be Me: Mathis in Nashville, an album from Johnny Mathis
A 2012 Volkswagen Beetle, due for delivery May 2011

2012

A two-hour special called "Oprah's Favorite Things 2012" aired on Oprah Winfrey Network on November 18, 2012.  It features an audience of 30 deserving people receiving items totaled at over $10,000.

2017
On the November 21, 2017 episode of Rachael Ray, host Rachael Ray presented a list of Oprah's Favorite Things for 2017, with Gayle King serving as Winfrey's representative (Winfrey did not appear, and only one audience member, chosen via a drawing, actually received all 102 items on the list).

Among the items on the 2017 Favorite Things list:
Pudus Classics red lumberjack plaid slipper socks
Amazon Echo Show
Sonicare DiamondClean Smart electric toothbrush, with accompanying smartphone app
Breville panini press
English muffins from The Model Bakery
The Greatest Showman: Original Motion Picture Soundtrack

Controversy and criticisms
After being featured on the Oprah’s Favorite Things segment, businesses typically experience a large boost in their website traffic and in visits to their stores.  For small businesses with limited resources and a small staff, the resulting boost in customers can cause the business to become overwhelmed and unable to meet customer demands.  According to Scott Schroeder, executive vice president and chief financial officer of Garrett Popcorn Shops, being featured on the episode resulted in over 100,000 hits to the website on the afternoon the episode was aired and sales increased in December by over 100%.  This caused the business to go from "making popcorn eight hours a day to 24 hours a day."

The episodes have also met with controversy when businesses that were not featured on the episode made claims that they were.  According to show insiders, this is one reason the format was changed for the 2006 season.

The website The A.V. Club made fun of the uselessness and blandness of Oprah's 2007 list by posting a feature called 'Oprah's Favorite Thing or Symptom of Clinical Depression?" The 2008 decision to use inexpensive gifts drew jokes from Jimmy Kimmel Live!, including a mash-up that featured Winfrey supposedly giving away thumb tacks, to a much-dismayed audience.

Further criticism and satire have been directed at the reactions from the people in the audience, which typically ranged from cheering and screaming to hysterical crying from men and women alike. A memorable parody of this was featured on a Saturday Night Live skit, where the audience tore the studio apart in their frenzied anticipation of the freebies they would get. Winfrey herself has admitted amusement by some of the audience reactions, having made a certain amount of fun of them in a behind-the-scenes series that aired on Oprah Winfrey Network.

See also 
 The Late Late Toy Show, a similarly gift and toy-focused special of The Late Late Show by RTÉ in Ireland
 TV3 Toy Show, a variation of the Toy Show format by RTÉ's rival, TV3

References

External links
 Oprah Winfrey Official Site
 Oprah Winfrey Show 
 Oprah's Favorite Things 2007

Oprah Winfrey
Thanksgiving television specials